U.S. seal may refer to:
Great Seal of the United States
A United States Navy SEAL